The Luhansk People's Republic (LPR) is a disputed entity in eastern Ukraine's Luhansk Oblast. The LPR historically sought to be recognised as independent after breaking away from Ukraine but was annexed by Russia on 30 September 2022. The status is now as an unrecognised Russian republic.

The LPR is closely linked to the Donetsk People's Republic (DPR), which has a nearly identical political status and history of formation.

The LPR has foreign relations with Russia, North Korea, and Syria, as of July 2022. The LPR also maintains relations with South Ossetia and Abkhazia, two breakaway states that are claimed by Georgia. The LPR and DPR mutually recognise each other.

Foreign relations of the Luhansk People's Republic 

  – Luhansk People's Republic–Russia relations

Embassies of the Luhansk People's Republic 

  – a Representative Office is located in Moscow

 in 2014, another Representative Office opened in St. Petersburg

 in 2019, a Migration Office opened in Novoshakhtinsk (Rostov Oblast)

  – in 2015, an LPR Representative Office opened in Tskhinvali

See also 
 List of diplomatic missions of the Donetsk People's Republic
 List of states with limited recognition

References 

Luhansk People's Republic
Politics of the Luhansk People's Republic
Foreign relations of the Luhansk People's Republic